Boating is an 1874 painting by French artist Édouard Manet in the collection of the Metropolitan Museum of Art, New York.

Done in oil on canvas, the painting depicts a man (believed to be Manet's brother in law, Rodolphe Leenhoff) and an unknown woman boating on the River Seine at Argenteuil in the Paris suburbs. 

In the work Manet uses a delicate touch to exploit the broad planes of color and strong diagonals of Japanese prints. 

The work is on view in Gallery 818.

References

1876 paintings
Paintings by Édouard Manet
Paintings in the collection of the Metropolitan Museum of Art
Maritime paintings